Präzisionsteilefertigung Steffen Pfüller (PTF) is a producer of high-tech precision parts for companies in the semiconductor, medical, food, laser and aerospace industries.

PTF's headquarters are in Stollberg, Germany, with subsidiaries in Jena, Germany and Suzhou, China.

References

External links
 PTF - Präzisionsteilefertigung Steffen Pfüller web site

Companies based in Saxony
Manufacturing companies established in 1992
Manufacturing companies of Germany